Denis Potoma (born 15 February 2000) is a Slovak professional footballer who plays as an attacking midfielder for Polish club Sandecja Nowy Sącz.

Club career

ŠK Slovan Bratislava
Potoma joined Slovan's youth team in 2014, initially on loan from eastern-Slovakian lower division club Tesla Stropkov, which later became a transfer. 

He made his debut for the senior team of Slovan Bratislava in the final game of 2018–19 Fortuna Liga season, on 24 May 2019 against Sereď at Tehelné Pole (3:1 win). He substituted Aleksandar Čavrić in the 86th minute of the match. Potoma and Slovan were crowned champions after the match.

ŠKF Sereď
On 12 February 2020, Slovan had announced that Potoma will spend the upcoming half-season at iClinic Sereď, in hopes of getting league play-time and returning to Slovan prepared to help the first team in the next season.

Honours
ŠK Slovan Bratislava
Slovak Super Liga: 2018–19

References

External links
 ŠK Slovan Bratislava official club profile
 
 Futbalnet profile

2000 births
Living people
People from Svidník
Sportspeople from the Prešov Region
Slovak footballers
Slovakia youth international footballers
Slovakia under-21 international footballers
Association football midfielders
ŠK Slovan Bratislava players
ŠKF Sereď players
MFK Skalica players
Sandecja Nowy Sącz players
Slovak Super Liga players
Slovak expatriate footballers
Expatriate footballers in Poland
Slovak expatriate sportspeople in Poland